AWWA is an acronym that can have several meanings,

 American Water Works Association
 Amputees and War Wounded Association